Sunkesula is one of the largest barrages across the Tungabhadra River in Kurnool district, Andhra Pradesh, India. It was built in 1861, during the British raj, for transporting goods on the K. C. Canal.

References

Dams in Andhra Pradesh
Buildings and structures in Kurnool district
Dams completed in 1861
1851 establishments in India